Switzerland has a dense network of roads and railways. The Swiss public transport network has a total length of 24,500 kilometers and has more than 2600 stations and stops.

The crossing of the Alps is an important route for European transportation, as the Alps separate Northern Europe from Southern Europe. Alpine railway routes began in 1882 with the Gotthard Railway with its central Gotthard Rail Tunnel, followed in 1906 by the Simplon Tunnel and the Lötschberg Tunnel in 1913. As part of the New Railway Link through the Alps (NRLA) in 2007 the Lötschberg Base Tunnel opened and in 2016 the Gotthard Base Tunnel opened on 1 June.

The Swiss road network is funded by road tolls and vehicle taxes. The Swiss motorway system requires the purchase of a road tax disc - which costs 40 Swiss francs for one calendar year - in order to use its roadways, for both passenger cars and trucks. The Swiss motorway network has a total length of 1,638 kilometres (as of 2000) and has also - with an area of 41,290 km2 - one of the highest motorway densities in the world.

Zurich Airport is Switzerland's largest international flight gateway, handling 24.9 million passengers in 2013. The second largest airport, Geneva Cointrin, handled 14.4 million passengers (2013) and the third largest EuroAirport Basel Mulhouse Freiburg 6.5 million passengers; both airports are shared with France.

Switzerland has approved billions of francs for the improvement of its public transportation infrastructure. The modal split for public transportation is one of the highest in Europe, standing at 21.3% in 2010. In many cities with a population above 100,000, the modal split for public transportation lies above 50%.

Railways

Switzerland has a very high density of railway network, with an average of 122 km of track for every 1,000 km2 (average of 46 km in Europe). In 2008, each Swiss citizen traveled, on average, 2,422 km by rail, which makes them the most frequent users of rail transport.

Many of the Swiss standard gauge railway lines are part of the nationwide Swiss Federal Railways system, although other standard gauge lines are operated by independent companies such as BLS AG. In addition numerous narrow gauge railways are operated, the largest company of its kind being the Rhaetian Railway. In total 5,100 km of rail network are used.

The Swiss Federal Railways run some 5000 passenger train services covering about 274,000 kilometres daily. Half of these train services are long distance services; the other half are regional and suburban services. In 2013, 366 million passengers used the Swiss Federal Railways.

Rail transport in Switzerland also includes a car and truck transportation service (German: Autoverlad) on some lines.

Urban rail

Urban commuter rail networks are focused on the country's major cities: Zurich, Geneva, Basel, Bern, Lausanne and Neuchâtel.

Lausanne is the only city with a metro system (Lausanne Metro), which includes two lines: one is light rail; the other, a fully automated metro, opened in 2008. After its opening, Lausanne replaced Rennes as the smallest city in the world to have a full metro system.

Maglev

In response to the increasing need for transport capacity and the cost of ground surface infrastructures, an underground transportation system has been proposed and studied. The trains would use linear motor and magnetic levitation to reach speeds about 500 km per hour. The project is not likely to be realized in the near future, but a license for application has been deposited for a trial line between Geneva and Lausanne.

Mountain rail

Trains cannot climb steep gradients, so it is necessary to build large amounts of track in order to gain height gradually. Transversals through the Alps were made possible with the use of hidden circular tunnels, which are called Spiral. In the case of extremely mountainous terrain, railway engineers opted for the more economical narrow gauge construction.

The many railway viaducts of the Rhaetian Railway in the canton of Graubünden, built for the most part in the early 20th century, have become a tourist attraction as well as a necessary transport system, drawing rail enthusiasts from all over the world.

Some railways were built only for tourist purposes as the Gornergrat or the Jungfraujoch, Europe's highest station in the Bernese Oberland, at an altitude of 3,454 metres (11,330 ft).

Roads

Switzerland has a network of two-lane national roads. These roads usually lack a median or central reservation. Some stretches are controlled-access, in that all traffic must enter and exit through ramps and must cross using grade separations.

Two of the important motorways are the A1, running from St. Margrethen in northeastern Switzerland's canton of St. Gallen through to Geneva in southwestern Switzerland, and the A2, running from Basel in northwestern Switzerland to Chiasso in southern Switzerland's canton of Ticino, using the Gotthard Road Tunnel.

Autobahn (plural: Autobahnen) is the German name; in French-speaking Switzerland they are known as autoroutes, and in Italian-speaking Switzerland they are known as autostrade (singular: autostrada). Swiss motorways have general speed limits of 120 km/h (75 mph).

Road passenger transport

Local bus services cover the whole country. Postauto cover the smaller urban areas and every region not connected to the rail network.

Switzerland also has a well-developed network of car sharing organised by the Mobility Carsharing cooperative.

Biking
Cycling is included and promoted in the Swiss constitution since 2018. Concretely, the authorities must develop bike-lanes and related infrastructures.

The Asian trend of bike sharing came to Switzerland in 2017 with new companies emerging such as oBike, PubliBike and Smide. The Singaporean-based company oBike launched in the city of Zurich on 5 July 2017.

Air transport

64 (2012)
Airports - with paved runways
total: 41
over 3,047 m: 3
Zurich Airport
Geneva Airport
EuroAirport Basel Mulhouse Freiburg
2,438 to 3,047 m: 2
1,524 to 2,437 m: 13
914 to 1,523 m: 6
Bern Airport
Lugano Airport
under 914 m: 17 (2012)
Airports - with unpaved runways:
total: 23
under 914 m: 23 (2012)
Heliports: 1

Zurich Airport  also called Kloten Airport, located in Kloten, canton of Zurich, is Switzerland's largest international flight gateway and hub to Swiss International Air Lines and Lufthansa. The airport handled 27.6 million passengers in 2016. In 2003, Zurich International completed an expansion project in which it built a car park, a midfield terminal, and an automated underground train to move passengers between the existing terminal complex and the new terminal. Zurich International lost traffic when Swissair shut down its operations. When Lufthansa took over its successor Swiss International Air Lines (SWISS), traffic grew again.

Zurich Airport's railway station (Zürich Flughafen) is underneath the terminal. There are trains to many parts of Switzerland; frequent S-Bahn services, plus direct Inter-regio and intercity services to Winterthur, Bern, Basel and Lucerne (Luzern). By changing trains at Zürich Hauptbahnhof most other places in Switzerland can be reached in a few hours.

The second largest airport of the country, Geneva Airport , handled 16.5 million passengers in 2016. The airport has a single runway, the longest of its kind in Switzerland at 3,900 meters, built in 1960. The runway could only be built after an agreement was reached with France to exchange a piece of territory since it wouldn't otherwise fit entirely in Switzerland. In compensation, the airport has a french sector in its terminals, and therefore flights incoming/outgoing from/to France are considered domestic and a segregated road leads to the airport from France without crossing the Swiss customs.

A turnaround occurred in 1996 when Swissair decided to abandon all the intercontinental routes departing from Geneva except for New York and Washington (that is, all its African destinations). The airport then requested the Swiss Federal Government to implement an open skies policy for Geneva and abolish the legal monopoly enjoyed by Swissair. Following the open skies policy, Geneva Airport now serves over 110 direct destinations from more than 55 airlines. It is the main hub for easyJet Switzerland and a focus airport for Swiss International Air Lines, as well as home to the executive office of IATA.

Road access to the airport is provided by highways: It's directly connected to the rest of Switzerland by the A1 highway and France via the A40. It has its own railway station, Geneva Airport railway station, from the Swiss Federal Railways (CFF) located right besides the main terminal with trains regularly departing to the rest of Switzerland, towards Neuchâtel, Lausanne-Fribourg-Berne-Zurich, and Lausanne-Vevey-Montreux-Sion-Brig and stopping in all cases in Geneva main train station located in the city centre, which lies only 7 minutes away from the airport by train. Geneva train station is also connected via HSR to France, and to the Léman Express rail network. The airport is also served by several Genevan public transport lines such as trolleybus line 10. 

The third largest Swiss airport is EuroAirport Basel Mulhouse Freiburg which handled 7.3 million passengers in 2016 and is located entirely on French territory.

Water transport

Inland waterways
65 km; Rhine (Basel to Rheinfelden, Schaffhausen to Bodensee)
12 navigable lakes
The Interlaken Ship Canal
The Nidau-Büren Canal
The Thun Ship Canal

Ports and harbors 
Switzerland is a landlocked country and has only small ports on its rivers, such as the Port of Basel.

Merchant marine

total: 38 ships (1,000 GT or over) 597,049 GT/
ships by type: bulk 19, cargo 9, chemical tanker 5, container 4, petroleum tanker 1

Ship lines on lakes
Compagnie Générale de Navigation sur le lac Léman on Lake Geneva
Zürichsee-Schifffahrtsgesellschaft on Lake Zurich
Società Navigazione del Lago di Lugano on Lake Lugano

Pipelines

Oversight
The Swiss transport system is overseen by several offices within the Federal Department of Environment, Transport, Energy and Communications. The principal such offices are the:

 Federal Office for Civil Aviation, which is responsible for civil aviation.
 Federal Office of Transport, which is responsible for public and freight transport, covering rail transport, cableways, ships, trams and buses.
 Federal Roads Authority, which is responsible for roads.

See also

NRLA
List of mountain passes in Switzerland
List of mountains of Switzerland accessible by public transport
Vehicle registration plates of Switzerland
Swiss Transport Museum
List of Swiss tariff networks

References

Citations

Sources

External links 

 http://www.autobahnen.ch/ — A website about Swiss motorways